Juggernaut is a 1936 British mystery film, starring Boris Karloff and Joan Wyndham. Directed by Henry Edwards, it was based on the novel by Alice Campbell and was distributed by Julius Hagen Productions. It was also known as The Demon Doctor.

Plot
Victor Sartorius (Karloff) is an ailing doctor working in Morocco. He teams up with Lady Yvonne Clifford (Mona Goya) in a plot to poison her husband, Sir Charles Clifford (Morton Selten), so he can collect the 20,000 pounds necessary to save his experiments and his funding. Roger Clifford (Arthur Margetson), the son of Sir Charles has also been marked for death. The only one who can stop the murder plot of Sartorius is Nurse Eve Rowe (Joan Wyndham).

Cast
 Boris Karloff as Dr. Victor Sartorius
 Joan Wyndham as Nurse Eve Rowe
 Arthur Margetson as Roger Clifford
 Mona Goya as Lady Yvonne Clifford
 Anthony Ireland as Capt. Arthur Halliday (as Antony Ireland)
 Morton Selten as Sir Charles Clifford
 Nina Boucicault as Miss Mary Clifford (as Mina Boucicault)
 Gibb McLaughlin as Jacques (servant)
 J. H. Roberts as Chalmers (butler) (as H.H. Roberts)
 Victor Rietti as Dr. Bousquet

See also
 Boris Karloff filmography

References

External links

 Download The Juggernaut ebook from Project Gutenberg

1936 films
British black-and-white films
British mystery films
Films directed by Henry Edwards
1936 mystery films
Films shot at Twickenham Film Studios
Films set in France
1930s English-language films
1930s British films